Mpumi is a South African given name. Notable people with the name include:

Mpumi Madisa (born 1980), South African businesswoman
Mpumi Mpofu, South African Secretary of Defence
Mpumi Nyandeni (born 1987), South African footballer

African given names